is a 2011 Japanese biographical film about Isoroku Yamamoto. Other English home media titles of the film are The Admiral,
and Admiral Yamamoto.
English titles not used in home video releases are Yamamoto Isoroku, the Commander-in-Chief of the Combined Fleet and Admiral Isoroku.

Plot
The final 5 years of Isoroku Yamamoto's military career is shown through his family life. Yamamoto was a great naval strategist who climbed up the ranks in the Imperial Japanese Navy. Yamamoto was against many of the Imperial Japanese Army's decisions. He opposed the signing of the Tripartite Pact with Germany and Italy in 1939 and attempted to prevent the impending conflict with the United States amid World War II. This caused disdain from Japanese war hawks such as newspaper editor Kagekiyo Munakata (portrayed by Teruyuki Kagawa) and military officials. He was educated in the United States, aware of its strengths, and thought a war would be futile. His superiors increasingly pressured him to plan for a full-scale war with the US. Yamamoto was conflicted by his principles and duties. The Japanese military establishment entangles Yamamoto in the war and orders him to prepare the attack on Pearl Harbor. Yamamoto was obligated to carry out the orders as the commander-in-chief of the Japanese Imperial Navy's Combined Fleet. The film also follows the perspective of a Japanese A6M Zero aerial battalion, from the attack on Pearl Harbor to the Battle of Midway and finally to the American ambush of Yamamoto's Mitsubishi G4M.

Cast
Kōji Yakusho as Admiral Isoroku Yamamoto
Hiroshi Tamaki as newspaper reporter Toshikazu Shindo
Toshirō Yanagiba as Admiral Shigeyoshi Inoue
Hiroshi Abe as Rear Admiral Tamon Yamaguchi
Shunji Igarashi as pilot Koichi Makino
Kenji Kawahara as pilot Keiji Arima
Masahiro Usui as pilot Takashi Saeki
Eisaku Yoshida as Yoshitake Miyake
Takeo Nakahara as Vice Admiral Chūichi Nagumo
Ikuji Nakamura as Vice Admiral Matome Ugaki
Bandō Mitsugorō X as Vice Admiral Teikichi Hori
Mieko Harada as Reiko Yamamoto
Asaka Seto as Shizu Taniguchi
Rena Tanaka as Yoshie Kanzaki
Masatō Ibu as Admiral Osami Nagano
Akira Emoto as Prime Minister Mitsumasa Yonai
Kippei Shiina as Captain Kameto Kuroshima
Nobuko Miyamoto as Kazuko Takahashi
Teruyuki Kagawa as newspaper editor Kagekiyo Munakata

Filming
The making of the film lasted four years. Kōji Yakusho was reportedly the only actor considered for the role of Yamamoto, and the film would have been canceled if he turned it down. Yakusho was offered the role in the summer of 2009, and accepted the role in the winter of 2010. The production staff declared it intended to present an image of "what a Japanese leader should be".

The film was supervised by renowned historical scholar-writer Kazutoshi Hando. The war movie intended to show the real life of Gensui Yamamoto, Commander-in-Chief of the Combined Fleet. It is a literary work. The award-winning director was Izuru Narushima. The lead actor was Koji Yakusho.

The film was theatrically released in Japan on 308 screens nationwide, the box office revenue reaching ¥150,787,300 Yen. The film was viewed by 124,972 people in the first two days of December 24 and 25, 2011. It first appeared in the audience movie ranking (according to the box office news agency), coming in second place.

In September 2012, more than half a year after its release in Japan, the film was specially invited to be screened at the 36th Montreal World Film Festival.

Under the supervision of Hando, he focused on the accuracy of the film's depiction, even including the tableware used aboard ship. Ingenuity has been devised to depict personality and humanity, including scenes in which it is shown that Yamamoto liked water steamed buns (Mizumanju) and the traditional Japanese dessert Shiruko, personal details not dealt with in other works.

At the time of shooting, the Ministry of the Navy's government building (commonly known as red brick building) did not exist, so the main building of the Ministry of Justice, which has a similar appearance, was used for the location.

Music 
 Theme song "Makoto"
 Song- Kei Ogura (Universal Music Group) / Lyrics- Kei Ogura / Composition-Takeo Kato, Masaru Suezaki Exhibition / Arrangement-Takeo Kato
 Love theme "For whom the bell rings"
 Song- Maki Changu (Vap) / Lyrics / Composition- Maki Changu / Arrangement- Jun Sato

Reception
Rob Schwartz from Metropolis described the film as a "well-paced and well-acted work", which "is not a bad watch for those interested in a Japanese view of the war". Schwartz further noted that unlike the 1968 film with the same title, which "was a piece of propaganda", the 2011 film "doesn’t fall into that trap". Ronnie Scheib from Variety characterised the film as "Izuru Narushima's well-crafted, rather old-fashioned and unquestioning elegy" to Yamamoto, which "succeeds where many biopics fail in fully integrating the private man and the public figure". At the 36th Japan Academy Film Prize, Fumio Hashimoto won an award for Outstanding Achievement in Sound Recording. Kōji Yakusho was nominated for Outstanding Performance by an Actor in a Leading Role.

Manga
The manga version was serialized in "Grand Jump" (Shueisha), which was first published on November 16, 2011, from the first issue to the 17th issue (released on July 18, 2012). Supervision: Kazutoshi Hando, Drawing: Rem Sakakibara.

References

External links
   
 
 

2011 films
2011 war drama films
Japanese war drama films
Biographical films about military leaders
Cultural depictions of Isoroku Yamamoto
Films directed by Izuru Narushima
Films scored by Taro Iwashiro
Pacific War films
World War II films based on actual events
World War II naval films
2011 drama films
Japanese World War II films
2010s Japanese films
World War II aviation films